Molhadhoo (Dhivehi: މޮޅަދޫ) is one of the inhabited islands of Haa Alif Atoll and is geographically part of the Ihavandhippolhu Atoll in the Maldives. It is an island-level administrative constituency governed by the Molhadhoo Island Council.

Geography

Ecology
Half a century ago, Molhadhoo along with the neighbouring uninhabited island of Gaamathikulhudhoo, was famous for their nesting green sea turtles (Chelonia mydas), with over 20,000 nesting on its beaches every year. However the numbers have been in decline since then, amounting to less than 400 females coming ashore in 2001.

Demography

References

External links
Isles: Molhadhoo

Islands of the Maldives
Uninhabited islands of the Maldives